A distributed search engine is a search engine where there is no central server. Unlike traditional centralized search engines, work such as crawling, data mining, indexing, and query processing is distributed among several peers in a decentralized manner where there is no single point of control.

History

Rorur

The short-term goal of the Rorur project is to create a distributed search engine that runs on a network of computers of common people in a decentralized fashion. A competitive latency and the delivery of the requested rank can be achieved if the number of participating nodes is large enough and the fraction of malicious nodes does not exceed a calculable threshold https://rorur.com/Whitepaper. The architecture builds on open-source algorithms that rely on public contribution for development and maintenance. To incentivize those who join and contribute, the revenue from advertising is distributed among node maintainers. The long-term goal is to have built-in personal search agents that construct and maintain personal knowledge graphs to assist the human-web interaction.

Presearch 
Started in 2017, Presearch is an ERC20 powered (PRE) search engine powered by a distributed network of community operated nodes which aggregate results from a variety of sources. This powers the searches at presearch.com/
This is planned to be a precursor where each node collaborates on a global decentralised index.
 Presearch averages 5 million searches per day and has 2.2 million registered users. On Sept 1, 2021, Presearch was added as a default option to the search engine list on Android for the EU. On May 27, 2022, Presearch officially transitioned from its Testnet to a Mainnet. This means all search traffic through the service now runs over Presearch’s decentralized network of volunteer-run nodes.

YaCy 
On December 15, 2003 Michael Christen announced development of a P2P-based search engine, eventually named YaCy, on the heise online forums.

Dews 
A theoretical design for a distributed search engine discussed in academic literature.

Seeks 
Seeks was an open source websearch proxy and collaborative distributed tool for websearch. It ceased to have a usable release in 2016.

InfraSearch 
In April 2000 several programmers (including Gene Kan, Steve Waterhouse) built a prototype P2P web search engine based on Gnutella called InfraSearch. The technology was later acquired by Sun Microsystems and incorporated into the JXTA project. It was meant to run inside the participating websites' databases creating a P2P network that could be accessed through the InfraSearch website.

Opencola 
On May 31, 2000 Steelbridge Inc. announced development of OpenCOLA a collaborative distributive open source search engine. It runs on the user's computer and crawls the web pages and links the user puts in their opencola folder and shares resulting index over its P2P network.

Mario 
In February 2001 Wolf Garbe published an idea of a peer-to-peer search engine,
started the Faroo prototype in 2004, and released it in 2005.

Goals

The goals of building a distributed search engine include:

1. to create an independent search engine powered by the community;

2. to make the search operation open and transparent by relying on open-source software;

3. to distribute the advertising revenue to node maintainers, which may help create more robust web infrastructure;

4. to allow researchers to contribute to the development of open-source and publicly-maintainable ranking algorithms and to oversee the training of the algorithm parameters.

Challenges

1. The amount of data to be processed is enormous. The size of the visible web is estimated at 5PB spread around 10 billion pages.

2. The latency of the distributed operation must be competitive with the latency of the commercial search engines. 

3. A mechanism that prevents malicious users from corrupting the distributed data structures or the rank needs to be developed.

See also 
 List of search engines#P2P search engines
 Distributed processing

References

Internet search engines
Internet service providers